Mohammad Ebrahim Hemmat (April 2, 1955 in Shahreza, Isfahan Province – March 7, 1984 in Majnoon Island, Iraq) was a teacher and an Iranian military leader. He was one of the highest ranking officers of the Islamic Revolutionary Guard Corps during the Iran-Iraq War. In 1982, he spent a few months fighting against Israel during the 1982 Lebanon War. He then returned to Iran and held commanding roles in several missions during the Iran-Iraq War. He was killed in March 1984 in Operation Kheibar.

Early life
Mohammad Ebrahim Hemmat was born on the 2nd of April 1955 in Shahreza. He completed his studies in his hometown and in the year 1973, he earned a diploma. That year he enrolled in the Isfahan University of Teacher Training. He earned his associate degree in 1975 and two years later, he served his compulsory military service. After his military service, he returned to his birthplace and for a while, he taught history in Shahreza Middle School and several schools on the outskirts of the city. During this period, he tried to familiarize the students with the concept of revolution and for this reason, he was given several warnings from the SAVAK. His words had such an impact that he was forced to travel from city to city, fleeing from the Shah's agents. He first went to Firuzabad and propagated the word of the Revolution there. After a while, he moved to Yasuj. He left for Dogonbadan, barely escaping arrest and eventually, he settled down in Ahvaz. As the Revolution was coming to its climax in 1978, he returned to Shahreza and actively led protests there. At the end of one of these rallies, he was sentenced to death due to his anti-regime activities and had to disguise his appearance and struggle in secret until the Islamic revolution.

After Islamic Revolution
Following the Revolution, Hemmat and his companions worked to establish order in the city. They formed a Committee of the Islamic Revolution and the IRGC of Shahreza. Hemmat was appointed director of IRGC's Public Relations in Shahreza.

In 1980, he was dispatched to Paveh, Kurdistan, to calm unrest. Hemmat lived in the Kurdistan province for two years; he had a significant effort to deal with the Kurds' poverty. Hemmat served two years as the commander of IRGC in Paveh. The locals became upset when he wanted to leave the region.

Iran–Iraq war
When Iraq invaded Iran, Hemmat joined the military and departed for the southern front. Ahmad Motevaselian and Hemmat were commissioned by the commander-in-chief of the IRGC to form the Muhammad Rasoolullah Brigade.

He was director of a significant part of Operation Fath ol-Mobin. Hemmat played an important role in Operation Beit ol-Moqaddas as the deputy commander of the Muhammad Rasoolullah Brigade. He was eventually killed during Operation Kheibar, at 28 years old.

Operations 
 Fath al-Mubin
 Tariq al-Quds
 Operation Beit ol-Moqaddas
 Ramadhan
 Khaybar
 Israeli invasion of Lebanon

In Roger Waters: The Wall 

His picture was shown among many other people in Roger Waters The Wall in the ending credits.

Legacy
Hemmat Expressway, Shahid Hemmat Metro Station and Hemmat Underpass in Tehran is named after him.

See also 
 List of Iranian commanders in the Iran–Iraq War
 Mehdi Bakeri
 Ali Hashemi (Commander)

References

1955 births
1984 deaths
Iranian military personnel killed in the Iran–Iraq War
Islamic Revolutionary Guard Corps personnel of the Iran–Iraq War
Recipients of the Order of Fath
Imperial Iranian Army conscripted personnel